Catlin Township may refer to the following townships in the United States:

 Catlin Township, Vermilion County, Illinois
 Catlin Township, Marion County, Kansas